Gemma Paz (born 18 August 1981) is a Spanish gymnast. She competed in three events at the 1996 Summer Olympics.

References

1981 births
Living people
Spanish female artistic gymnasts
Olympic gymnasts of Spain
Gymnasts at the 1996 Summer Olympics
Gymnasts from Madrid
20th-century Spanish women